Calcium lactate gluconate, also known as GLOCAL, is a soluble salt of calcium, lactic acid and gluconic acid used in effervescent calcium tablets.  Its chemical formula is Ca5(C3H5O3)6·(C6H11O7)4·2H2O. It was first developed by Sandoz, Switzerland. Calcium lactate gluconate is used in the functional and fortified food industry due to its good solubility and neutral taste. In addition, it is used in various spherification techniques in molecular gastronomy. It can also be used to help neutralize HF (hydrofluoric acid) poisoning.

References

Calcium compounds
Lactates
Gluconates
E-number additives